HŽKK Zrinjski 2010 Mostar is a Croat-founded basketball team from the city of Mostar, Bosnia and Herzegovina.

The club plays in the Basketball Championship of Bosnia and Herzegovina. It is part of the Zrinjski Mostar sport society. It was formed in 1995.

Names in history 
 1995–2010 - Zrinjski Mostar
 2010–present - Zrinjski 2010 Mostar

External links
Official website 
Profile at eurobasket.com

Women's basketball teams in Bosnia and Herzegovina
Sport in Mostar
Basketball teams established in 1995
Croatian sports clubs outside Croatia